Kattuvelampalayam is a village of Namakkal district in the state of Tamil Nadu, India.

Location
Kattuvelampalayam is located in the bank of the river Cauvery. Nearly 200 families of different castes live in the area, and most are dependent on agriculture. Rice, turmeric, sugar cane and ground nuts are the major crops cultivated throughout the year. Kattuvelampalayam comes under the A.Erayamangalam panchayat. It has one co-operative society. The nearest towns are Erode (18–20 km) and Thiruchengode (15–16 km).  KVP has many political leaders from Dravida Munnetra Kazhagam (DMK), MDMK and ADMK parties.

Education
KVP has one Punchayat union government School.

Nearest schools
Govt HR sec school, Erayamangalam
Govt HR sec school, Vittampalayam
Govt HR sec school, Solasiramani
Govt HR sec school, Kokkarayenpet
Amman School, Solasiramani.

Water resources
Kattuvelampalayam is located in the bank of the river Cauvery. And landwater to be provided to KVP for peoples usage.compare to other areas here water resource is good.

Sports
Kathiravan Boys Cricket Club (KBCC) was developed in the 1980s, with annual cricket tournaments having been held at the Erayamangalam cricket ground since 2008.

References

Villages in Namakkal district